Pozniaky is a historical neighbourhood, a residential area and the remains of a village on the territory of the Darnitskyi district, on the left bank of Kyiv, the capital of Ukraine. Pozniaky metro station is situated in this neighborhood.

Pozniaky is a historical area,  of Kyiv. It is located between the Dnieper, the railway, Revutsky Street and Mykola Bazhan Avenue. It is divided into Western Poznyaki (between the Dnieper embankment and Grigorenko Avenue) and Eastern Poznyaki (between Grigorenko Avenue and Revutsky Street). The main buildings are from the early 1990s to the present time; Poznyaki are built up with both standard housing and modern expensive houses.

History 
Poznyaki has been known since 1571 as a settlement of "good boyars". The name is probably from the surname Poznyak. It is known that the Poznyak family (including Leonty and Moses) owned the village of Pankivshchina on the left bank of the Dnieper (probably the former possessions of the Pankovichi), which was also called Poznyakovshchina. In 1631, this village was transferred (or sold) to the Metropolitan of Kyiv Petro Mohyla, who, in turn, donated it to the Brotherhood Monastery. However, there are no documents on the identity of Poznyakovshchina and Poznyakov. Since the 1st half of the 20th century, Poznyaki has been divided into Old and New (most of them were located on the territory of the modern industrial zone). In the 1980s, a significant part of the old buildings of Poznyaki was demolished, and since 1989 a residential area of ​​Poznyaki has been built in its place.

External links

 Позняки in Wiki-Encyclopedia Kyiv  

Neighborhoods in Kyiv